Bruguières is a commune of the Haute-Garonne department in southwestern France.

Population

Twin town
  Xeraco, Spain

See also
Communes of the Haute-Garonne department

References

Communes of Haute-Garonne